Andy Raleigh (born 17 March 1981) is an English former professional rugby league footballer. He played in the Super League for the Huddersfield Giants, the Hull Kingston Rovers and the Wakefield Trinity Wildcats.

Background
Raleigh was born in Huddersfield, West Yorkshire, England.

He attended All Saints' RC High School from 1992-1997. Andy Raleigh is the son of Walter Raleigh who worked for many years as a teacher at King James's School, Huddersfield. Walter is a massive supporter of Huddersfield and helped Andy greatly in his rise to being a professional rugby league footballer. Andy was also greatly supported by his mum, Eileen, who was a teacher at Royds Hall High School in Huddersfield, but recently retired. He has an older brother, Nicholas, who is also a good rugby player, but never turned professional.

Club career
He previously played for Sheffield Eagles and Hull Kingston Rovers, winning numerous awards in lower divisions before signing for Huddersfield for the start of the 2006 Super League season.

Raleigh played for Huddersfield in the 2006 Challenge Cup Final at  against St. Helens but the Giants lost 12-42.

(For 2014 Super League season highlights, stats and results click on 2014 Super League season results)

References

External links
(archived by web.archive.org) Huddersfield Giants profile

1981 births
Living people
English rugby league players
Huddersfield Giants players
Hull Kingston Rovers players
Rugby league players from Huddersfield
Rugby league props
Rugby league second-rows
Sheffield Eagles players
Wakefield Trinity players